The Vijayawada–Gudur section is a railway line connecting  in the Indian state of Andhra Pradesh and . The main line is part of the Howrah–Chennai and New Delhi–Chennai main lines.

Geography 
The Vijayawada–Gudur line runs along the Coromandel Coast, lying between the Eastern Ghats and the Bay of Bengal. The main line crosses the Krishna immediately after its departure from Vijayawada.

Railway zone jurisdiction 
The track from Vijayawada to Gudur is under the administrative jurisdiction of South Coast Railway

History 
The Southern Mahratta Railway Company linked Goa with Guntakal with a metre-gauge line and also linked Vijayawada with Mormugao in 1890. The southern part of the East Coast State Railway (from Waltair to Vijayawada) was taken over by Madras Railway in 1901. The track doubled during  the  period  from  the  1st  April to  the  31st  October, Bezwada-Gudur section 1958 is 7.5 Mils. The Section is beaingdoubling part of  a  mileage  aggregating 101 By  April  1959  about  40  miles  is  ex-pected  to be completed  As the earth-work  and  bridging  involved  is  heavy, no  definite  date  for  completion  of  the balance  can  yet  be  given  but  it   t« expected  that  the  full 101  miles  will br  readv  by  31 March 1961.

Railway reorganization 
In the early 1950s legislation was passed authorizing the central government to take over independent railway systems that were there. On 14 April 1951 the Madras and Southern Mahratta Railway, the South Indian Railway Company and Mysore State Railway were merged to form Southern Railway.  Subsequently, Nizam's Guaranteed State Railway was also merged into Southern Railway. On 2 October 1966, the Secunderabad, Solapur, Hubli and Vijayawada Divisions, covering the former territories of Nizam's Guaranteed State Railway and certain portions of Madras and Southern Mahratta Railway were separated from Southern Railway to form the South Central Railway. In 1977, Guntakal division of Southern Railway was transferred to South Central Railway and the Solapur division transferred to Central Railway. Amongst the seven new zones created in 2010 was South Western Railway, which was carved out of Southern Railway.

Electrification 
Howrah–Chennai Mail was the first train in South Eastern Railway to be hauled by a diesel engine (WDM-1) in 1965. The Vijayawada–Gudur–Chennai section was completely electrified by 1980. The Howrah–Chennai route was completely electrified by 2005. Section-wise electrification was as follows: Vijayawada–Chirala 1979–80; Chirala–Ongole, Ongole–Ulavapadu, Ulavapadu–Bitragunta, Bitragunta–Pagudupadu, Gudur–Venkatagiri, Venkatagiri–Renigunta, and Renigunta–Tirupati 1983–85; Krishna Canal–Guntur, Krishna Canal–Tenali and Guntur–Tenali 1987–89; Arakkonam–Renigunta 1982–85.

Speed limits 
The New Delhi to Puratchi Thalaivar Dr. M.G. Ramachandran Central Railway Station line (Grand Trunk route), of which the Vijayawada–Gudur section is a part,  is classified as a "Group A" line which can take speeds up to 160 km/h. On the branch lines the speed limit is 100 km/hr.

Passenger movement 

References

External links 
  Trains at Vijayawada
Trains at Gudur Central

5 ft 6 in gauge railways in India
Rail transport in Andhra Pradesh
Rail transport in Tamil Nadu